Brandon Dixon (born April 26, 1990) is a former American football cornerback. He was drafted by the New York Jets in the sixth round of the 2014 NFL Draft. He played college football at Northwest Missouri State.

Dixon has also been a member of the Tampa Bay Buccaneers, Seattle Seahawks, Indianapolis Colts, New England Patriots, New Orleans Saints, Pittsburgh Steelers, and New York Giants.

College career
In 2012, Dixon was selected to the Daktronics and D2Football.com second-team All-America team and was selected to the All-America third-team by The Associated Press.

Professional career

New York Jets
On May 10, 2014, Dixon was drafted by the New York Jets in the sixth round of the 2014 NFL Draft. Dixon was released on August 30, 2014.

Tampa Bay Buccaneers
On September 1, 2014, Dixon signed with the Tampa Bay Buccaneers to join their practice squad.

On September 6, 2014, the Buccaneers promoted Dixon to their active roster.

In 14 games with the Buccaneers, Dixon recorded 8 solo tackles, 1 assisted tackle, 1 interception, and 2 passes defensed.

Seattle Seahawks
On September 6, 2015, the Seattle Seahawks signed Dixon to their practice squad.

On September 12, 2015, Dixon was cut from the Seahawks practice squad

New England Patriots
Dixon was signed to the New England Patriots practice squad on October 1, 2015. He was released on October 28, 2015.

New Orleans Saints
Dixon was signed to the New Orleans Saints practice squad on November 5, 2015, reuniting him with his twin brother Brian Dixon.

The signing made the brothers the only set of twins to play on the same team since the AFL-NFL merger and the first since 1926. They are the twelfth set of twins to play in the NFL and along with the Pounceys and the McCourtys, are the third active set of twins currently playing in the NFL. On August 30, 2016, he was released by the Saints.

Pittsburgh Steelers
On December 7, 2016, Dixon was signed to the Steelers' practice squad. On December 20, he was released from the Steelers' practice squad. Seven days later, the Steelers re-signed him to the practice squad. He signed a reserve/future contract with the Steelers on January 24, 2017. He was waived on September 2, 2017.

New York Giants
On October 12, 2017, Dixon was signed to the New York Giants' practice squad. He was promoted to the active roster on November 28, 2017.

On May 15, 2018, Dixon was waived by the Giants.

Orlando Apollos
Dixon signed with the Orlando Apollos of the Alliance of American Football for the inaugural 2019 season.

Personal life
Dixon's twin brother, Brian, played alongside him in New Orleans and is a currently a free agent. Dixon is the cousin of former cornerback Benny Sapp who played in the National Football League.

References

External links
Joliet Junior College bio
Northwest Missouri State bio
New York Jets bio
Tampa Bay Buccaneers bio
Seattle Seahawks bio
Indianapolis Colts bio

1990 births
Living people
American football cornerbacks
New England Patriots players
New Orleans Saints players
New York Giants players
New York Jets players
Northwest Missouri State Bearcats football players
Orlando Apollos players
People from Margate, Florida
People from Pompano Beach, Florida
Pittsburgh Steelers players
Players of American football from Florida
Seattle Seahawks players
Sportspeople from Broward County, Florida
Tampa Bay Buccaneers players
American twins
Twin sportspeople